Piet Mondrian (1872–1944) was a Dutch painter and theoretician. 

Mondrian may also refer to:

Buildings
 Mondrian Hotel, the name of five boutique hotels owned and/or operated by SBE Entertainment Group
 The Mondrian, a high-rise building in Dallas, Texas, U.S.
 Mondrian, a building at the University of Auckland's Elam School of Fine Arts, New Zealand

Science and technology
 Mondrian (Google software), developed by Guido van Rossum
 Mondrian (software), a statistical data visualization system
 Mondrian OLAP server, a software component
 Mondrian, an object-oriented version of Haskell (programming language)
 Mondrian, a visual test for color constancy

Other uses
 The Mondrian collection of Yves Saint Laurent, a fashion collection
 The Mondrians, a Swiss band

See also